K. N. A Khader is a member of 13th Kerala Legislative Assembly. He is a member of Indian Union Muslim League and represents Vengara constituency. He was previously elected to Kerala Legislative Assembly in 2001 representing Kondotty constituency.

Political life
He started his political career in 1970 through students' movements. In 1987, he joined IUML party. He became the state secretary of IUML and now is the Malappuram District Secretary of IUML.

Positions held
State President and Secretary, A.I.S.F.  and member of its National Executive Committee
Malappuram District Secretary and State Committee member, C.P.I.
Member and Vice President of Malappuram District Council and Muslim League Malappuram District Secretary
Muslim League State Secretariat Member
State President, S.T.U
Member, Regional Transport Authority 
National Savings Scheme Advisory Committee, Kerala Wakf Board
Kerala State Library Council Malappuram District President
Chairman Mahakavi Moyinkutty Vaidyar Smaraka Committee
Chairman, Serifed
General Secretary Muslim league, Malappuram District Committee 2016-continues
Candidate, Vengara by-election 2017

Personal life
He is the son of Alavi Musliyar K N and Elachola Aysha. He was born at Vadakkemanna on January 1, 1950. He is a BA.LLB. degree holder. He is an advocate and notary public.

See also
 Bahauddeen Muhammed Jamaluddeen Nadwi

References

Members of the Kerala Legislative Assembly
Indian Union Muslim League politicians
1950 births
Living people